Clogher Éire Óg is a Gaelic Athletic Association club. The club is based in Clogher in County Tyrone, Northern Ireland.

History
The present club is in existence since 1938.  A Team existed in Clogher (Rapparees) for a brief period in 1907-08. Clogher were a strong force in West Tyrone competitions in the period 1940-60; won West Tyrone senior league in 1951 and 1957, St. Enda Cup in 1961; finalists in Tyrone Senior Football Championship in 1948. Won JFC in 1972, 2000, Div 5 1975; Div 3 1985; U14FC 1999; MFL 2001; Reserve Div 3 2015; Div 3 2018.  The club and its members are strong supporters of Scór. They fielded a parish camogie team in the 1960s and a handball club in the early 1980s.  Their new prunty Pitch and dressing rooms opened in 1987,  and their second pitch and floodlights in 2002. They recently completed construction of a covered stand.

In 2013, the senior team finished runners up in the Junior league and just narrowly missed out on promotion via the playoffs.

In 2015, The Reserve team made history by claiming the club's first ever reserve league title. They remained unbeaten throughout the campaign.

In 2017, Clogher senior team were defeated in the Junior Championship Final, held in Carrickmore, by Tattyreagh. On course to the final Clogher had played Dregish, Brocagh and Clan na nGael. The following season, 2018, Clogher won promotion to intermediate football, for the first time in 17 years, by winning the division 3 league.

Achievements
 Tyrone Senior Football Championship (runners-up) 1948
 Tyrone Junior Football Championship (2) 
 1972, 2000
 Tyrone Junior Football League (2) 
 1985, 2018

References

Gaelic games clubs in County Tyrone
Gaelic football clubs in County Tyrone